Scott Gendel (born June 24, 1977) is an American composer, pianist, and vocal coach. Gendel is known mostly for his art songs and choral music, but has also written numerous operas and musical theatre works, as well as orchestral and chamber music.
]

Career 
Gendel attended Bard College from 1995-1999, where he studied composition with Joan Tower and Daron Hagen. He then received his MM and DMA degrees from the University of Wisconsin-Madison, where he studied vocal coaching & piano with Martha Fischer, and composition with Stephen Dembski.

His art songs first achieved national attention with his song cycle "Forgotten Light", which won First Prize in the inaugural ASCAP / Lotte Lehmann Foundation Art Song Composition Competition, as well as having selected songs recorded by soprano Julia Faulkner and pianist Martha Fischer for Naxos Records’ “Between The Bliss And Me.”  More recently, Gendel’s song “At Last” was recorded by soprano Camille Zamora and cellist Yo-Yo Ma for “An AIDS Quilt Songbook: Sing for Hope.”  Opera News called Gendel’s song on that recording “luminous, transcendently lyrical.” 

Gendel’s art song output is now published by Classical Vocal Reprints, and those songs receive frequent performances. His cycle “I’m Afraid It’s You” won second prize in the 2015 NATS Art Song Composition Competition. Writing in NewMusicBox, Daron Hagen said “Scott Gendel's art songs combine superb craftsmanship, a sophisticated and well-honed sense of prosody, texts of excellent literary quality, and a sure heart.” 

Other notable works of Gendel’s include the choral/orchestral cantata “All Souls” for All Souls Church Unitarian in Washington D.C., the musical theatre piece “Unearthed” written with poet/playwright Nick Lantz for Endstation Theatre, the oratorio “Barbara Allen” which combines Appalachian folk song with orchestral concert music, and the opera for young audiences “Super Storm,” being written in collaboration with Opera For The Young.

List of works 
Source:

Voice and piano 
 To Wander in the Dark (1998)
 Meditation at Oyster River (1999)
 Keats Songs (2000)
 Spring (2001)
 Violi Songs (2003)
 My Symphony (2003)
 For Miriam (2004)
 Annabel Lee (2005)
 Forgotten Light (2005)
 Return and Return Again (2006)
 The Space Between (2006)
 The Saddest Noise (2007)
 My Beloved (2007) (unaccompanied)
 My Songs Do Not Belong To Me (2011)
 Love Songs of Marichiko (2012)
 Italian Art Songs & Arias, Reimagined (2002-2013)
 I’m Afraid It’s You (2014)
 What We Did Not Know (2014)
 Advice to Those Like Me, With Hearts Like Kindling (2015)
 Kids Who Die (2016)

Theatre and Opera 
 A Song That’s True (1999) one-act opera for young audiences
 Iphigenia at Aulis (2004) evening-length one-act opera
 The Night Knight (2007) madrigal comedy / a cappella opera for all ages
 Hibernation (2007) songs and incidental music for the play
 Across a Distance (2010) music theatre work in two acts for soprano and Deaf actor 
 Unearthed (2013) musical in two acts
 Seven Princesses and a Bear (2015) - ballet for young audiences
 The Snow Goose (2016) songs and incidental music for storytelling / radio play

Choral works 
 We Must Be Slow (1997) SSA
 Now Blue October (2000) SSATTB
 The Premonition (2000) SSATTB
 Instructions for Angels (2001) SSATBB
 Love Song (2001) SSAA
 A Dream Within a Dream (2003) SATB
 Two Spring Songs (2003) SATB
 All Weeping Things (2004) SATB
 Eternal Summer (2005) SATB
 The Last Invocation (2005) SSATBB
 Prayer (2005) SATB and piano
 Ave Verum Corpus, After Byrd (2006) SSAATTBB
 The Vine (2006) TTB
 Ten Thousand Miles (2007) 4 SATB choirs
 The Road of Excess (2007) SSATTB
 Invocation to the Muse / Persephone’s Spring (2008) multiple choirs, violin, cello, piano, percussion
 Midwinter (I Sorrow Not) (2008) 4 SATB choirs and one SSA choir
 Hower-Glass (2009) SSATBB and piano
 No Room at the Inn (2009) SATB and piano
 The White Birds (2010) SATB and piano
 Juno’s Garden (2010) SSATBB
 It Was My Father’s Custom (2011) SATB, percussion, harp, and string orchestra
 There Came a Wind Like a Bugle (2011) SATB and piano
 In Praise of the Mind (2012) SATB and brass quintet
 Just Delicate Needles (2013) SSATB and piano
 Peace Everywhere (2013) SATB with 3-part descant
 The Singing Place (2013) SATB and piano
 All Souls (2013) - cantata for soprano and baritone soloists, SATB choir, and chamber orchestra
 Sound and Fury (2014) SATB, piano, violin, and drum
 #dreamsongs (2014) SATB, cello, and piano
 Una Sañosa Porfía & Ayo Visto Lo Mappamundi (2014) SATB, recorder, harp, and string quartet
 We Are Such Stuff as Dreams are Made On (2014) SSATB
 In Summer (2015) SATB
 Across the Water (2016) SSA + treble choir, flute, piano, and guitar
 That Which Is Near (2017) SATB, string quartet, and piano
 Barbara Allen (2017) - oratorio for soprano and tenor soloists, SATB choir, and chamber orchestra

Chamber music 
 Time and Time Again (2000) string quartet
 Effusion (2000) tuba and piano
 A Tango for Closed Eyes (2001) violin, 2 saxophones, guitar, piano, and bass
 Breath (2002) English horn, viola, and piano
 Fantasy Pieces (2002) clarinet and piano
 Just Thinking of You (2003) solo piano
 Wisp (2004) solo flute
 4th Avenue (2005) solo piano
 A Gleam in Her Eye (2005) percussion ensemble
 Elder Tree (2008) viola and piano
 For Lotte, Asleep (2009) piano quintet
 Heat Lightning (2011) 2 harps, 3 percussionists, piano

Vocal chamber music 
 DiPrima Songs (1996) soprano and clarinet
 Spelt from Sibyl’s Leaves (2001) medium-high voice, violin, and harp
 Evensong (2002) soprano, alto flute, 2 violins, harpsichord, and cello
 Player Piano (2002) singing actor and piano 4-hands
 Patterns (2003) mezzo-soprano, flute, and piano
 GIC to HAR (2004) high voice and string quartet
 Songs for Marie’s Lutebook (2004) voice and guitar
 Shadow Songs (2005) soprano and violin
 Since I Left You (2005) tenor, violin, guitar, and harp
 Facts About the Moon (2010) soprano, flute, cello, guitar, piano, and percussion
 Metamorphosis (2011) voice and harp
 Worship Songs (2016) high voice and percussion

Orchestra/band 
 Clinging Fire (2000) for symphony orchestra
 Requiem Humana (2001) - secular Mass for SATB choir, string quartet, and percussion
 Crackle and Snap (2001) for small chamber orchestra
 Behind Glass (2002) for chamber orchestra
 Nimbus (2003) for wind ensemble
 For Miriam (orchestrated version) (2004) for high voice and chamber orchestra
 Aulis (2004) for small chamber orchestra
 Nova (2005) for symphony orchestra
 Dynamo (2006) for concert band
 It Was My Father’s Custom (2011) carol for SATB choir, percussion, harp, and string orchestra
 All Souls (2013) - cantata for soprano and baritone soloists, SATB choir, and chamber orchestra
 The Raven (2013) for string orchestra and timpani
 Barbara Allen (2017) - oratorio for soprano and tenor soloists, SATB choir, and chamber orchestra

References

1977 births
Living people
American male composers
21st-century American composers
21st-century American pianists
American male pianists
21st-century American male musicians